realme narzo 20 Pro is an Android smartphone developed by Realme and was launched on 21 September 2020. It is third among the Narzo 20 series unveiled by Realme. Narzo 20 Pro is available in two colours: White Knight and Black Ninja.

Specifications

Hardware 
The realme narzo 20 Pro uses the MediaTek Helio G95 gaming processor. It supports 65W Super Dart charging technology and offers a 4,500mAh battery. The phone measures 162.3x75.4x9.4mm and weighs 191 grams. It comes with dual sim slots and up to 128GB storage that is expandable via microSD card through a dedicated slot.

The realme narzo 20 Pro features a 6.5-inch full-HD+ Ultra Smooth display with a 120 Hz touch sampling rate and a 90 Hz refresh rate. The display is also protected by a Corning Gorilla Glass.

Software 
realme narzo 20 Pro runs on Realme UI based on Android 10.

Camera 
The phone has a 48 megapixel AI quad rear camera setup with an f/1.8 lens. It also has a 16 megapixel Sony wide-angle selfie camera with an f/2.1 lens.

Reception 
The phone received mixed reviews from critics. Times Now praised the phone for its battery, overall smooth performance but criticized its camera performance. The Indian Express described it as a gaming phone praising its smooth display, quick charging.

References

External links 
 Official website

Realme mobile phones
Smartphones
Mobile phones introduced in 2020
Mobile phones with multiple rear cameras
Mobile phones with 4K video recording